The 2014 International German Open (also known as the bet–at–home Open – German Tennis Championships 2014 for sponsorship reasons) was a men's tennis tournament played on outdoor red clay courts. It was the 108th edition of the event known that year as the International German Open and was part of the ATP World Tour 500 series of the 2014 ATP World Tour. It took place at the Am Rothenbaum in Hamburg, Germany, from 14 July through 20 July 2014. Unseeded Leonardo Mayer won the singles title.

Points and prize money

Points distribution

Prize money

Singles main draw entrants

Seeds 

 1 Rankings are as of July 7, 2014

Other entrants 
The following players received wildcards into the singles main draw:
  David Ferrer
  Peter Gojowczyk
  Tobias Kamke
  Julian Reister
  Alexander Zverev

The following players received entry from the qualifying draw:
  Mate Delić
  Gastão Elias
  Daniel Gimeno Traver
  Marsel İlhan
  Filip Krajinović
  Albert Ramos-Viñolas

The following player received entry as a lucky loser:
  Thomaz Bellucci

Withdrawals
Before the tournament
  Nicolás Almagro → replaced by  Pablo Andújar
  Roberto Bautista Agut → replaced by  Thomaz Bellucci
  Jérémy Chardy → replaced by  Pere Riba
  Tommy Haas (shoulder injury) → replaced by  Jiří Veselý
  Denis Istomin → replaced by  Albert Montañés
  Jürgen Melzer → replaced by  Dustin Brown
  Stéphane Robert → replaced by  Dušan Lajović

During the tournament
  Martin Kližan

Retirements
  Filip Krajinović (stomach virus)
  Julian Reister (right ankle injury)

Doubles main draw entrants

Seeds 

 Rankings are as of July 7, 2014

Other entrants 
The following pairs received wildcards into the doubles main draw:
  Andre Begemann /  Alexander Zverev
  Martin Emmrich /  Christopher Kas

The following pair received entry from the qualifying draw:
  Mikhail Kukushkin /  Philipp Marx

The following pair received entry as lucky losers:
  Facundo Bagnis /  Diego Sebastián Schwartzman

Withdrawals 
Before the tournament
  Roberto Bautista Agut (gastrointestinal illness)
  Julian Reister (right ankle injury)

Finals

Singles 

  Leonardo Mayer defeated  David Ferrer,  6–7(3–7), 6–1, 7–6(7–4)

Doubles 

  Marin Draganja /  Florin Mergea defeated  Alexander Peya /  Bruno Soares, 6–4, 7–5

References

External links 
  
   
 Association of Tennis Professionals (ATP) tournament profile

 
International German Open
Hamburg European Open
International German Open
July 2014 sports events in Germany